United States Army balloon squadrons and companies organized under the Aviation Section, U.S. Signal Corps and served overseas with the United States Army Air Service before and during World War I. There were also French, British, and German balloon corps. 

The history of military ballooning includes the American Civil War era Union Army Balloon Corps and the even earlier French Aerostatic Corps.

At the start of World War I, the organization of the Air Service of the American Expeditionary Force included observation balloon units organized into companies, squadrons, and wings and each company was equipped with one balloon. Five companies comprised a squadron, and three squadrons made up a wing. By the end of the war 110 companies had been created. In the field Balloon companies were allotted to the ground units they supported as needed. In 1918 June, with squadron organization discontinued, company designations were numbered and organized into groups. Only 35 companies made it to France with the American Expeditionary Force (AEF). 17 companies served at the front, making 1,642 combat ascensions, while six other groups were en route to the front at the armistice.

After the war, the National Association of American Balloon Corps Veterans was organized and published a history of the service: Eyes of the Army : a story about the Observation Balloon Service of World War I by Craig S. Herbert. The group published a quarterly newsletter titled Haul Down and Ease Off.

1 to 50
 1st Balloon Squadron
 A, 14-Aug-1917, Split into 25th, and 26th 16-Feb-1918
 B,
 C,
 D,
 HHC
 2d Balloon Squadron
 A, - 1st Balloon company 1-Oct-1917 (AEF)
 B, - 2nd Balloon company ?-?-1917 (AEF)
 C, - 3rd Balloon company 13-Sept-1917 (AEF)
 D, - 4th Balloon company 25-Sept-1917 (AEF)
HHC
 3d Balloon Squadron
 A, - 5th Balloon company 4-Nov-1917 (AEF)
 B, - 6th Balloon company 4-Nov-1917 (AEF)
 C, - 7th Balloon company 3-Nov-1917 (AEF)
 D, - 8th Balloon company 4-Nov-1917 (AEF)
 HHC
 4th Balloon Squadron
 A, - 9th Balloon company 14-Nov-1917 (AEF)
 B, - 10th Balloon company 14-Nov-1917 (AEF)
 C, - 13th Balloon company 22-Jan-1918 (AEF)
 D, - 14th Balloon company 13-Nov-1917 (AEF)
 HHC
 5th Balloon Squadron
 A, - 11th Balloon company ?-?-? (AEF)
 B, - 12th Balloon company ?-?-? (AEF)
 C, - 15th Balloon company ?-?-? (AEF)
 D, - 16th Balloon company 14-Dec-1917 (AEF)
 HHC
 17th Balloon company 21-Jan-1918 (AEF)
 18th Balloon company 21-Jan-1918 (AEF)
 19th Balloon company 24-Jan-1918 (AEF)
 20th Balloon company 24-Jan-1918 (AEF)
 21st Balloon company
 22d Balloon company
 23d Balloon company 16-Feb-1918 (AEF)
 24th Balloon company 17-Jan-1918 Fort Monroe (AEF)
 25th Balloon company 16-Feb-1918 Post Field (AEF)
 26th Balloon company  2-April-1918 Post Field (AEF)
 27th Balloon company
 28th Balloon company
 29th Balloon company
 30th Balloon company 6-March-1918 Waco Army Airfield (AEF)
 31st Balloon company Camp Knox (US Signal Corps)
 32d Balloon company
 33d Balloon company
 34th Balloon company 30-Mar-1918 Camp Wise (AEF)
 35th Balloon company 30-Mar-1918 Camp Wise (AEF)
 36th Balloon company 30-Mar-1918 Camp Wise (AEF)
 37th Balloon company
 38th Balloon company
 39th Balloon company
 40th Balloon company
 41st Balloon company
 42d Balloon company 20-Mar-1918 Camp Wise (AEF)
 43d Balloon company 20-Mar-1918 Camp Wise (AEF)
 44th Balloon company (AEF)
 45th Balloon company (AEF)
 46th Balloon company
 47th Balloon company
 48th Balloon company
 49th Balloon company
 50th Balloon company

51 to 105

 51st Balloon company
 52d Balloon company
 53d Balloon company
 54th Balloon company
 55th Balloon company
 56th Balloon company
 57th Balloon company
 58th Balloon company (AEF)
 59th Balloon company
 60th Balloon company
 61st Balloon company
 62d Balloon company
 63d Balloon company
 64th Balloon company
 65th Balloon company
 66th Balloon company
 67th Balloon company
 68th Balloon company
 69th Balloon company (AEF)
 70th Balloon company
 71st Balloon company
 72d Balloon company
 73d Balloon company
 74th Balloon company
 75th Balloon company
 76th Balloon company
 77th Balloon company
 78th Balloon company
 79th Balloon company
 80th Balloon company
 81st Balloon company
 82d Balloon company
 83d Balloon company
 84th Balloon company
 85th Balloon company
 86th Balloon company
 87th Balloon company
 88th Balloon company
 89th Balloon company
 90th Balloon company
 91st Balloon company
 92d Balloon company
 93d Balloon company
 94th Balloon company
 95th Balloon company
 96th Balloon company
 97th Balloon company
 98th Balloon company
 99th Balloon company
 100th Balloon company
 101st Balloon company
 102d Balloon company
 103d Balloon company
 104th Balloon company
 105th Balloon company

See also

 Barrage balloon
 US Army Airships
 Camp John Wise
 Observation balloon
 Post Field
 Ross Army Airfield / Santa Anita Golf Course
 Brooks Field
Fort Omaha Balloon School

References

 https://timesmachine.nytimes.com/timesmachine/1919/04/13/96293467.pdf
 http://www.footnote.com/image/#20339490
 http://www.footnote.com/image/#19227433 redesignation

Further reading
A Grandstand Seat: The American Balloon Service in World War I, Eileen F. Lebow, Greenwood Publishing Group, 1998

External links
 http://camp-john-wise-aerostation.com/
 http://www.worldwar1.com/dbc/balloon43.htm
 https://www.scribd.com/doc/25241521/1921-Operating-Equipment-for-U-S-Army-Observation-Balloons

Balloon Squadrons
Balloon Squadrons
Lists of flying squadrons

cs:Letecká sekce Spojovacího sboru Spojených států